Poet Gardens is a food hall located in the Gateway Cities community of Whittier, California. Poet Gardens opened in the fall of 2019, becoming the first food hall to open in the city. It is located on the ground floor of the historic Nixon Building in Uptown Whittier. The food hall was conceptualized by Ricardo Diaz, a local restaurateur and chef.

See also 

 Food hall
 Whittier, California

References

External links 

 

Shopping malls in Los Angeles County, California
Whittier, California
Food halls
2019 establishments in California
Food markets in the United States